Fire Emblem is a series of tactical role-playing video games developed by Intelligent Systems and published by Nintendo. Its first game released in Japan in 1990, and is credited with both originating and popularizing its genre. Counting original mainline games and remakes, seventeen titles have been released as of 2023. Since the release of the seventh game in the series, Nintendo has localized all but four Fire Emblem titles, Fire Emblem: New Mystery of the Emblem, Fire Emblem: Genealogy of the Holy War, Fire Emblem: Thracia 776, and Fire Emblem: The Binding Blade for the West. Traditionally a hardcore series, incorporating permanent character death for units who fall in battle, the series has trended towards opening up to casual gamers with an optional casual mode, beginning with Fire Emblem: New Mystery of the Emblem in 2010.

Main series

Remakes

Spin-offs

References

Fire Emblem
Fire Emblem
Fire Emblem